Federal Route 54, or Jalan Kuala Selangor–Kepong or Jalan Kepong in Kuala Lumpur side, is a main federal road in Selangor, Malaysia. The road connects Asam Jawa near Kuala Selangor to Kepong near Kuala Lumpur. It is a main route to Kuala Lumpur from Federal Route 5. Federal Route 54 became the backbone of the road system linking Kuala Selangor to Kuala Lumpur before being surpassed by the Kuala Lumpur–Kuala Selangor Expressway (LATAR Expressway) E25 in 2011.

The Kilometre Zero of the Federal Route 54 is located at Assam Jawa in Kuala Selangor, at its interchange with the Federal Route 5, the main trunk road of the west coast of Peninsular Malaysia.

Features

At most sections, the Federal Route 54 was built under the JKR R5 road standard, allowing maximum speed limit of up to 90 km/h.

There is one overlap: Sri Damansara–Kepong: Federal Route 28 Kuala Lumpur Middle Ring Road 2

There is no other alternate route for Federal Route 54, and there are no sections with motorcycle lanes. There have many dangerous bends onward from Ijok to Sungai Buloh until 2020 which road authorities was upgraded to four-lane road and build with straight line removing the bends.

List of junctions and towns

Gallery

References

054